Anbaq-e Bala (also Romanized as Anbāq-e ‘Olyā; also known as Anbāq-e Qadīm) is a village in Qeshlaq Rural District, in the Central District of Ahar County, East Azerbaijan Province, Iran. At the 2006 census, its population was 19, in 5 families.

References 

Populated places in Ahar County